is a kind of traditional headgear worn by adult men in the Chinese Ming Dynasty.

History
According to the legend, the earliest people who wore  were Taoist priests. One day, the Hongwu Emperor of the Ming dynasty wore common clothes to visit the folk and he saw a Taoist priest wearing  on top of his head. Wear it on top of your head, then your hair will gather together" (ref. ""). The emperor was very satisfied with the answer that also referred to uniting the country. After the emperor returned to his palace, he ordered all the men in the country, from the emperor to the common man, to wear . Since then, the  has become the common headgear of adult men in the entire country. 

The two borders are adorned with two small circles made of gold, jade or copper and tin. Tie small ropes at each end of the side, cross in two circles, tie the top to the forehead, and make the side and eyebrows flush. In the Wanli period of the Ming dynasty, people began to use fallen hair and horsehair instead of silk to make .

Gallery

See also
Manggeon
Hanfu
Nanjing
Ming Dynasty

References 

Chinese headgear
Korean headgear